The women's doubles tennis competition was one of five tennis events at the 1924 Summer Olympics.

Draw

Finals

Top half

Bottom half

References

Sources
ITF, 2008 Olympic Tennis Event Media Guide

 

1924

Women's doubles
1924 in women's tennis
Ten
1924 in French women's sport